David Weir (23 December 1881 – 22 September 1929) was a member of the Queensland Legislative Assembly.

He was born at Glasgow, Scotland, the son of John Weir and his wife Jeannie (née Kerr) and migrated with his family to Australia the following year. They arrived in Townsville and he was educated at the Townsville Central State School and Townsville Grammar School. He began his working career as a clerk with the Adelaide Steamship Company in 1895 before joining the Queensland Railways and working there as a clerk. In this position he was transferred across the state, including Townsville, Maryborough, and Ipswich.

On 5 July 1907 he married Edith Guymer (died 1960) and together had two sons and a daughter. Weir died in September 1929 and his funeral proceeded from his former residence in Alice Street to the Maryborough Cemetery.

Public career
Weir, a member of the Labour Party, served as an alderman on the Maryborough City Council for one term. Following the resignation of Alfred Jones the sitting member for Maryborough to join the Queensland Legislative Council, Weir won the resulting by-election in 1917. He beat the National candidate, Mr Harding, and in fact increased the Labour vote from the previous state election.

He had represented the electorate for over twelve years when he died in office after a short illness in 1929.

References

Members of the Queensland Legislative Assembly
1881 births
1929 deaths
Australian Labor Party politicians
Scottish emigrants to Australia
People from Maryborough, Queensland
Australian Presbyterians
Australian Labor Party members of the Parliament of Queensland
20th-century Australian politicians